Alka Kumari Jha is a Nepalese politician who is member of Provincial Assembly of Madhesh Province. Jha left People's Socialist Party and joined Loktantrik Samajwadi Party since 2021.

References

Living people
Members of the Provincial Assembly of Madhesh Province
Madhesi people
People from Mahottari District
1979 births
Loktantrik Samajwadi Party, Nepal politicians